A list of films produced in Italy in 1995 (see 1995 in film):

See also
1995 in Italian television

External links
Italian films of 1995 at the Internet Movie Database

1995
Films
Italian